Transcription initiation factor TFIID subunit 9B is a protein that in humans is encoded by the TAF9B gene.

Initiation of transcription by RNA polymerase II requires the activities of more than 70 polypeptides. The protein that coordinates these activities is transcription factor IID (TFIID), which binds to the core promoter to position the polymerase properly, serves as the scaffold for assembly of the remainder of the transcription complex, and acts as a channel for regulatory signals. TFIID is composed of the TATA-binding protein (TBP) and a group of evolutionarily conserved proteins known as TBP-associated factors or TAFs. TAFs may participate in basal transcription, serve as coactivators, function in promoter recognition or modify general transcription factors (GTFs) to facilitate complex assembly and transcription initiation. This gene encodes a protein that is similar to one of the small subunits of TFIID, TBP-associated factor 9, and is also a subunit of TFIID. TAF9 and TAF9b share some functions but also have distinct roles in the transcriptional regulatory process.

References

Further reading